Rock Creek Township, Indiana may refer to one of the following places:

 Rock Creek Township, Bartholomew County, Indiana
 Rock Creek Township, Carroll County, Indiana
 Rock Creek Township, Huntington County, Indiana
 Rockcreek Township, Wells County, Indiana

See also 

Rock Creek Township (disambiguation)

Indiana township disambiguation pages